Castor Flood Meadows is a  biological Site of Special Scientific Interest on the western outskirts of Peterborough in Cambridgeshire.

This site on the banks of the River Nene is a remnant of formerly extensive flood meadows. Flora include slender tufted-sedges, early marsh-orchids and the nationally restricted narrow-leaved water-dropwort.

The Hereward Way long distance footpath goes through the site.

References

Sites of Special Scientific Interest in Cambridgeshire